Derek John Hill (born March 28, 1975 in Santa Monica, California) is an American racing driver. He is the son of  Formula One World Champion Phil Hill.

Career

Early career
Hill initially raced karts in California and Ferrari sports cars (his father won his F1 title with the team). Winning three of three races in the championship runoffs in Italy at the Mugello circuit in the Ferrari 355, Hill attracted the attention of the Alfa Romeo Factory DTM team and was invited to test the DTM car at Mugello in November 1995.

Barber Dodge Pro Series
Hill competed in the US-based Barber Dodge Pro Series in 1996, finishing third overall, taking Rookie-of-the-Year honors. In 1997, he took the championship title, winning four races in the process.

Professional Sports Car / IMSA
Also in 1997, Hill raced the Factory BMW M3 for the Prototype Technology Group in GTS3 Class. He won the GTS3 class at the Daytona 24 Hours and the Sebring 12 Hours as well as scoring two other wins with teammate, Javier Quiros.

Formula Toyota Atlantic
Hill moved up to Formula Toyota Atlantic for 1998, finishing 13th in the championship.

Formula Palmer Audi
Hill moved into European racing in 1999 by taking part in the second season of the Formula Palmer Audi series, organised by former F1 driver Jonathan Palmer. He finished 19th in that year's championship.

Formula 3000
For 2000, Hill competed in six races of the Italian Formula 3000 series, failing to score any points. The following year, he moved up to the more prestigious FIA-backed series with the DAMS team with teammate, Sébastien Bourdais, and remained there in 2002 (a part-season with Durango, replacing Alexander Müller) and 2003 (with Super Nova). In three years, he scored a total of four points and was dropped midway through 2003 in favour of Nicolas Kiesa, who had been left without a drive due to the withdrawal of the Super Nova-run Den Blå Avis outfit.

Nonetheless, Hill was often the most prominent American driver competing in Europe at this time. During this period he also entered into a management contract with Anthony Haas and Brigitte Hill – daughter and sister of Formula 1 champion namesakes Graham and Damon respectively – to act as his managers. He is currently involved in historic racing and working as a racing instructor after moving back to the United States to help look after his elderly father, who died in August 2008.

Other career highlights

In 1996, Hill competed in the 1996 Daytona 24 Hours in a Bugatti EB110 Competizione in the GT1 category, setting fastest lap in the Daytona Test Days. Leading the class in the seventh hour, the car experienced mechanical failure. This was the last time a Bugatti raced professionally in the United States.

In 2002, Hill raced in the Grand Am, Fontana Four-Hour California Grand Prix, in the Saleen S7. He won the category and finished fourth overall.

Racing record

Career summary

Complete Italian Formula 3000 results
(key) (Races in bold indicate pole position; races in italics indicate fastest lap)

Complete International Formula 3000 results

References

Footnotes

Books

Websites
Career statistics from driverdb.com.  Retrieved on September 13, 2007.

1975 births
Living people
American racing drivers
Atlantic Championship drivers
Auto GP drivers
International Formula 3000 drivers
Formula Palmer Audi drivers
American Le Mans Series drivers
Sportspeople from Santa Monica, California
Racing drivers from California
Barber Pro Series drivers
24 Hours of Daytona drivers
Super Nova Racing drivers
DAMS drivers
Durango drivers